This is a list of Argentine Academy Award winners and nominees. This list details the performances of Argentine filmmakers, actors, actresses and films that have either been submitted, nominated or have won an Academy Award.

Best International Feature Film

This list focuses on Argentine films that won or were nominated for the foreign language film award.

Acting
This list focuses on Argentine-born actors and actresses.

Supporting Actress

Art Direction

Director
This list focuses on Argentine-born directors.

Visual Effects

Writing categories

Original Screenplay
This list focuses on Argentine-born screenplay writers.

Best Story

Music
This list focuses on scores or songs created by Argentine-born composers.

Original Score

Original Song

Documentary categories
This list focuses on documentaries directed by Argentine-born filmmakers.

Documentary Feature

Documentary Short Subject

Short Film categories

Short Film, Animated

Special awards
This list focuses on Argentine-born honorees

Nominations and Winners

See also

 Cinema of Argentina
 List of Argentine films

Argentina
Cinema of Argentina
Academy Award